Indo-Caribbean Americans or Indian-Caribbean Americans,  are Americans who trace their ancestry ultimately to India, though whose recent ancestors lived in the Caribbean, where they migrated beginning in 1838 as indentured laborers. There are large populations of Indo-Trinidadian and Tobagonians and Indo-Guyanese along with a smaller population of Indo-Surinamese, Indo-Jamaicans and other Indo-Caribbeans in the United States, especially in the New York metropolitan area and Florida. The Washington metropolitan area, Texas, and Minnesota also have small numbers of Indo-Guyanese and Indo-Trinidadians. Indo-Caribbean Americans are a subgroup of Caribbean Americans as well as Indian Americans, which are a subgroup of South Asian Americans, which itself is a subgroup of Asian Americans.

Migration history
Since the 1960s, a large Indo-Caribbean community has developed in South Richmond Hill, a neighborhood in the New York City borough of Queens in the state of New York. The Indo-Caribbean population has also grown rapidly in the Floridian cities of Tampa, Orlando, Kissimmee, Poinciana, Fort Myers, Naples, Ocala, West Palm Beach, Lake Worth, Wellington, Boynton Beach,  Loxahatchee, The Acreage, Fort Lauderdale, Miami, Homestead, Cutler Bay, Palmetto Bay, Miami Gardens,  Port Saint Lucie, Coral Springs, Margate, Lauderdale Lakes, North Lauderdale (more than 1% of residents in the city were born in Trinidad and Tobago), Sunrise, Plantation, Parkland, Lauderhill, Pompano Beach, Hallandale Beach, Hollywood, Oakland Park, Tamarac, Cooper City, Miramar, Davie, Weston, Southwest Ranches, and Pembroke Pines. Indo-Surinamese tend to migrate to the Netherlands, but have started to settle in Florida and the New York metropolitan area in small numbers. Indo-Jamaicans also live in moderate numbers throughout the New York metropolitan area and Florida. There are also smaller numbers of Indo-Barbadians, Indo-Belizeans, Indo-French Guianese, Indo-Grenadians, Indo-Guadeloupeans, Indo-Martiniquais, Indo-Kittitian and Nevisian, Indo-Saint Lucian, Indo-Vincentian and Grenadinese in the New York metropolitan area and in Florida.

Culture and religion
Majority of Indo-Caribbean Americans are followers of Hinduism, with a minority belonging to Islam, Christianity and other religions. Major holidays such as Diwali, Phagwah, Eid, Hosay, Indian Arrival Day, Easter, and Christmas are celebrated with a distinct flavor unique to the Caribbean.

The Richmond Hill Phagwah Parade is the largest Holi celebration in the United States. Thousands attend the parade annually each Spring in Queens, with thousands of attendees crowding Liberty Avenue and Smoky Oval Park.

South Florida has become a destination for roti shops, Indian clothing boutiques, threading, mandirs/kovils, masjids, Indian churches, and annual Indo-Caribbean Hindu, Muslim, and Christian religious events. It is also a popular spot for Indo-Caribbean artists. The Florida Melody Makers are the most well known Indo-Caribbean American band for years and continue to perform around the Southeastern United States. WHSR 980 AM and WWNN used to host Indian musical and religious programming weekly every Saturday and featured community leaders like Pundit Ramsurat K. Maharaj, Bhagwan R. Singh, Natty Ramoutar, Peter Ganesh, Al Mustapha, and Sam Subramani.

Most cultural shows continue to tie a cultural bond between the Indo-Caribbean and Indian-American communities, as well as inter-religious bonding between Hindus, Muslims, Christians, Sikhs, Jains, and Buddhist especially those hosted at educational institutions with an Indian student association like Florida International University, Florida Atlantic University, Nova Southeastern University, Broward College, Palm Beach State College, and the University of Miami.

The Shiva Mandir in Oakland Park (first Hindu Mandir in South Florida, built in the 1980s by the Florida Hindu Organization led by Pt. Ramsurat K. Maharaj and hosts one of the largest annual Diwali shows in Florida), the Shree Saraswati Devi Mandir in Oakland Park, Krishna Mandir in Hollywood, Arya Samaj Mandir in Riverland, Shiva Lingam Mandir (Shiv Shakti Hanuman Mandir) in Margate, Palm Beach Hindu Mandir in Loxahatchee, Sanatan Sansthan Mandir in Loxahatchee, Shri Lakshmi Mandir in West Palm Beach, Florida Sevashram Sangha in Lake Worth, Lakshmi Narayan Mandir in Palmetto Estates, the Amar Jyoti Mandir in Palmetto Bay, and the Devi Bhavan Mandir in South Miami Heights are largely attended by Indo-Caribbeans. Plantation High School, a school where most Caribbeans and Asians are of Indian descent, hosted an annual Diwali show from 1993 to 2008. Starting as a one-day event in 2008 and expanding to a three-day event since 2009, the Divali Nagar USA entertains the local community with musical and religious performances, food, and vendors.

Music is a large part of the Indo-Caribbean American community, which includes the tunes of Bollywood, Carnatic music, taan, bhajans, kirtan, quwwalis, Sufi, chutney music, baithak gana, chutney parang, chutney soca, tassa, soca, parang, steel pan, and calypso. Bharatnatyam and kathak are respected classical traditional dances, and dance items from Hindi films, Bhojpuri films, Tamil films, and Telugu films have grown in favor as well. With the increasing emphasis on partying, Bollywood, chutney, chutney-soca, and soca music are preferred by the young crowd. (see Indo-Caribbean music)

Politically, Indo-Caribbean Americans tend to favor the Democratic Party, with a AALDEF exit poll indicating that a majority (86%) of Indo-Caribbean American voters backed the Joe Biden and Kamala Harris ticket in the 2020 presidential election.

Notable people

Indo-Guyanese Americans
 Avi Nash - actor
Gaiutra Bahadur - author
 Rhona Fox - actress and businesswoman
 Terry Vivkeanand Gajraj - singer
 Pandit Prakash Gossai - Hindu religious leader
Nezam Hafiz - cricketer and victim of the September 11 attacks
Rohit Jaggessar - film maker and founder of RBC Radio, the first South Asian-Indian radio station in the United States and India's first satellite radio statio
Harischandra Khemraj - writer
Rajiv Mohabir - poet
 Deborah Persaud – virologist
 Anisa Singh - singer, author, businesswoman
 Stanley Praimnath - bank executive and survivor of the September 11 attacks
Annand Mahendra "Victor" Ramdin - professional poker player and philanthropist
 Subhas Ramsaywack - actor known for his role on 30 Rock
Mahadeo Shivraj - actor and film maker
Reginald Lal Singh - actor and activist

Indo-Jamaican Americans
 Rajiv Maragh - jockey
 Shaun Bridgmohan - jockey

Indo-Surinamese Americans
 Vinoodh Matadin - fashion photographer

Indo-Trinidadian and Tobagonian Americans
 Mahaboob Ben Ali - businessman
 Devin Badhal - vice president of operations at Nike, Inc.
 Gerry Bednob - actor and comedian
Niala Boodhoo - journalist, host, and executive producer
 Some members of the Capildeo family
Annie Dookhan - convicted felon and former chemist
 Ria Persad - mathematician, classical musician, and model
 Reema Harrysingh - former First Lady of Trinidad and Tobago
 Ismith Khan - author and educator
 Kareem Rashad Sultan Khan, soldier
 Krishna Maharaj - British businessman convicted of murder in Miami, Florida
Davan Maharaj - former editor-in-chief and publisher of the Los Angeles Times
Devinder "Dave" Maraj - sports car racing team owner and automotive dealer
 Anantanand Rambachan - Hindu religious scholar 
 Arnold Rampersad - biographer and literary critic
 Lall Ramnath Sawh - urologist
 Errol Sitahal - actor
 Lakshmi Singh - NPR's national midday newscaster
 Bhaskar Sunkara - political publisher and writer
Anand Yankaran - singer and brother of Rakesh Yankaran

See also 

 British Indo-Caribbean people
 Indian Americans
 Indo-Caribbeans
 Desi
 Trinidadian Americans
 Fijian Americans
 Guyanese Americans
 Indian diaspora
 Tamil diaspora
 Indo-Fijian American

References

External links
 JAYADEVI ARTS INC. - "Preserving IndoCaribbean Arts & Culture"https://www.jayadeviarts.com/
Chhaya Community Development report
 The importance of being counted
 South Asian Indentured Labor - Online Archive of Research and Resources - an online archive and living syllabus of text-based resources related to Indian indentureship, with country-specific resources related to Indians indentured to the Caribbean and the Indo-Caribbean diaspora
 US Census 2000 foreign born population by country

Caribbean American
Caribbean American
American people of Caribbean descent
Indo-Caribbean